Francis George Bowles, Baron Bowles (2 May 1902 – 29 December 1970) was a British solicitor and politician. A long-serving Member of Parliament (MP), Bowles served briefly as a Deputy Speaker of the House of Commons, but is perhaps best known for agreeing to give up his safe seat to make way for Minister of Technology Frank Cousins.

Family and training
The son of an analytical chemist, Bowles was educated at Highgate School and the University of London where he obtained the degree of Bachelor of Laws and the London School of Economics where he became a Bachelor of Economic Science. He was admitted to the roll of solicitors in 1925. He worked for Pearl Assurance Ltd as their in-house solicitor; his grandfather had been Chairman of the company.

Politics
Originally a Liberal, Bowles soon shifted his allegiances to the Labour Party in 1924 while at the LSE. He fought the constituency of Hackney North in the 1929 general election, losing by 866 votes. He fought it again at the two succeeding elections of 1931 and 1935, in that case losing by 1,080.

Byelection candidate
Bowles was then chosen to fight the Preston by-election of November 1936. This was a highly marginal constituency, and the local Constituency Labour Party had wanted Bowles to fight it at the 1935 general election (Bowles refused as he had already committed to Hackney). He led an energetic campaign calling for the whole of Lancashire to be declared a Special Area for government assistance. On polling day, Bowles was defeated by 1,605 votes, while Florence White of the Spinsters' Pensions Association took 3,221.

Parliament
Finally, Bowles entered Parliament unopposed as MP for Nuneaton in March 1942, when the sitting MP was made one of the few Labour Peers. He was popular with fellow MPs, and in November 1946 was elected vice-chairman of the Parliamentary Labour Party. When Hubert Beaumont, Deputy Chairman of Committees (Second deputy Speaker) resigned due to ill health, Bowles was named to succeed him in October 1948; this recognised his mastery of Parliamentary procedure.

Following the 1950 general election, Bowles stood down as Deputy Speaker. He married Kay Musgrove later that year after a whirlwind courtship. In the 1950s he was made a Trustee of the House of Commons. Bowles tended to prefer the backseat roles which were important in Parliament but not widely known to the public. His few prominent campaigns included better pay for members of parliament, although he did also press for safer motor racing after the Le Mans disaster of 1955.

Giving up his seat
Bowles' constituency party, while holding him in reasonable regard, were inclined to complain that he neglected them and preferred to stay in London. When, following the 1964 general election, Frank Cousins was appointed as Minister of Technology, the Labour whips sought out MPs with safe seats who would accept a Peerage to make way for him. Bowles volunteered. He told the press he had initially been "shocked, tremendously worried and ill" at the thought of leaving the Commons, but decided to make the sacrifice. Cousins won the subsequent by-election.

Lords
Once he had been created a life peer on 12 December 1964 as Baron Bowles, of Nuneaton in the County of Warwick, Bowles was appointed as Captain of the Queen's Bodyguard of the Yeomen of the Guard and Government Deputy Chief Whip in the House of Lords. He held this post until the Labour government went out of office in 1970. Bowles died at the end of that year.

References

M. Stenton and S. Lees, "Who's Who of British MPs" Vol. IV (Harvester Press, 1981)
David Butler and Gareth Butler, "Twentieth Century British Political Facts 1900–2000" (Palgrave Macmillan, 2005)
Obituary, The Times, 30 December 1970
W.D. Rubinstein, "The Biographical Dictionary of Life Peers" (St Martins Press, New York, 1991)

External links 
 

1902 births
1970 deaths
People educated at Highgate School
Alumni of the London School of Economics
Labour Party (UK) MPs for English constituencies
Labour Party (UK) life peers
Ministers in the Wilson governments, 1964–1970
UK MPs 1935–1945
UK MPs 1945–1950
UK MPs 1950–1951
UK MPs 1951–1955
UK MPs 1955–1959
UK MPs 1959–1964
UK MPs 1964–1966
UK MPs who were granted peerages
Life peers created by Elizabeth II